Lavaca may stand for:
Lavaca, Arkansas
Lavaca County, Texas
Lavaca River
Port Lavaca, Texas
Lavaca Bay

See also
 la Vaca (disambiguation)
 Lavaka, a Tongan nobility title, see Tupou VI
 Lavaka, a type of hole caused by erosion of hillsides